José Joaquín Vicuña Larraín (1786–1857) was a Chilean politician whose selection as Vice President of Chile by Congress precipitated the Chilean Civil War of 1829. He was of Basque descent.

Vicuña was from a powerful family; of his brothers, Francisco Ramón Vicuña was an influential politician, and Manuel Vicuña was Archbishop of Santiago. He is primarily known for his role in the presidential election of 1829. He ran for president, finishing fourth; but rather than appointing the runner-up (or even second runner-up) as vice president, the Congress controlled by his brother's party appointed Joaquín, precipitating a civil war.

He founded the town of Vicuña in 1821.

References

 

1786 births
1857 deaths
Chilean people of Basque descent
People of the Chilean Civil War of 1829–30
Vice presidents of Chile
Candidates for President of Chile